Bali is a town of Qilihe District, Lanzhou, China. The town is located circa 10 km away from downtown Lanzhou.

It has a population of 24,000 and administers 10 administrative villages and 4 communities.

The town specializes in peach and pear cultivation.

References 

Township-level divisions of Gansu
Geography of Lanzhou
Towns in China